Sankara Narayanaamy Temple  is a Hindu temple dedicated to Shiva located at Sankarankovil, in state of Tamil Nadu in India. The temple was built by Ukkira Pandiyan in 10nd century CE.
Lord Shiva, known as ‘Sri Sankara Linga Swamy, is the presiding deity of this temple together with his consort Parvati, who is known as ‘Gomathi Amman’.

Architecture
Later the Pandya king, Ukkra Pandiyan built a temple and named the town as "Sankara Narayanar Kovil".

Temple Car Festival
The temple car festival is held in the month of Chithirai.The temple also emerged prosperous during the reign of Tenkasi Pandyas.

Culture
A snake pit found in the prakaram located around the Amman Sannidhi inside the temple known as "Vanmikam". It is believed that the sand extracted from the snake pit will cure all diseases.

Aadithapasu Festival
Aadithapasu Festival is held in the month of Ashadha involving the two gods Sankara Lingam and Narayanasamy. The ritual of the goddess Gomathi Amman posing in single foot is also followed.

Darshan timings
The temple is open on all days. The darshan timings are as below:
 Morning : 05:30 to 12:30 IST
 Evening : 16:00 to 21:00 IST

References

Pandyan architecture
Dravidian architecture
Hindu temples in Tenkasi District